

Universities

There are three central universities and nine state universities in the Jammu and Kashmir state of India.

Institutes of National Importance 

 Indian Institute of Technology Jammu 
 Indian Institute of Management Jammu
 National Institute of Technology Srinagar
 All India Institute of Medical Sciences, Vijaypur
 All India Institute of Medical Sciences, Awantipora

Medical Colleges 
 Government Medical College, Srinagar
 Government Medical College, Anantnag
 Government Medical College, Jammu
 Sher-i-Kashmir Institute of Medical Sciences
 Government Medical College, Baramulla
 Government Medical College, Kathua
 Government Medical College, Rajouri
 Acharya Shri Chander College of Medical Sciences, Jammu
 Government Medical College, Doda

Engineering Colleges

Engineering  colleges in Jammu a d Kashmir number more than 10
 Government College of Engineering and Technology, Zukura,  Kashmir
National Institute of Technology, Srinagar
 National Institute of Electronics & Information Technology
 Model Institute of Engineering and Technology, Jammu
 Government College of Engineering and Technology, Jammu
 University Institute of Engineering and Technology, Kathua
 MBS College of Engineering and Technology, Digaina
 Yogananda College of Engineering and Technology,   Muthi
 Bhargava College of Engineering  and Technology, Samba
 SSM College of Engineering and Technology, Baramulla
 School of Engineering, BGSB University, Rajouri
 College of Engineering and Technology, IUST Awantipora.
 Institute of Technology, Zukura Campus, Srinagar.

Other Prominent Colleges 
 Indian Institute of Mass Communication, Regional Centre, Jammu
 Jawahar Institute of Mountaineering and Winter Sports ,Pahalgam
 Indian Institute of Skiing and Mountaineering ,Gulmarg
 Institute of Hotel Management ,Srinagar
 Govt. MAM PG College, Jammu
 Govt. Gandhi Memorial Science College , Jammu
 Iqbal Institute of Technology and Management, Srinagar
 Food Craft Institute, Jammu
 Aviation & Management Training Establishment (AMTE), Srinagar
 Institute of Engineering Technology and Research Jammu
 Institution of Technicians and Engineers, Kashmir
Islamia College of Science and Commerce
 Government Women College Anantnag
 Rehmat-e-Alam College Of Education
 Government Polytechnic College Anantnag
 ITI Anantnag 
 Al Ahad College of Education
 Sri Pratap College
Government PG College Rajouri
 kashmir Institute of Medical Sciences and Technology Srinagar

Research Institutes
 Jammu Institute Of Ayurveda and Research (JIAR), Jammu
 Central Institute of Temperate Horticulture (ICAR), Srinagar
 Indian Institute of Integrative Medicine
 State Forest Research Institute - J&K
 Regional Ayurveda Research Institute, Rajinder Nagar Bantalab Jammu.

See also
 List of colleges affiliated to the University of Jammu
 List of colleges affiliated to the University of Kashmir
 List of engineering colleges in Jammu and Kashmir
 Jammu and Kashmir State Board of School Education
 List of institutes funded by the Central Government of India
 Sainik School, Nagrota
 Sainik School, Manasbal

References 

Jammu and Kashmir
Education
Education in Jammu and Kashmir
Universities and colleges in Azad Kashmir